Bashsiz Ujan (also Romanized as Bāshsīz Ūjān; also known as Bāsh Sīz) is a village in Ujan-e Gharbi Rural District, in the Central District of Bostanabad County, East Azerbaijan Province, Iran. At the 2006 census, its population was 466, in 81 families.

References 

Populated places in Bostanabad County